Takatoshi Iwamura (December 8, 1845 – January 4, 1906) was a Japanese politician who served as governor of Hiroshima Prefecture from May to July 1898. He was governor of Saga Prefecture (1874), Ehime Prefecture (1874–1880), Ishikawa Prefecture (1883–1890), Aichi Prefecture (1890–1892) and Fukuoka Prefecture (1895–1898).

1845 births
1906 deaths
Japanese Home Ministry government officials
Governors of Saga Prefecture
Governors of Ehime Prefecture
Governors of Ishikawa Prefecture
Governors of Aichi Prefecture
Governors of Fukuoka Prefecture
Governors of Hiroshima